Orthogonius bicolor is a species of ground beetle in the subfamily Orthogoniinae. It was described by Jedlicka in 1965.

References

bicolor
Beetles described in 1965